Budaka is a town in the Eastern Region of Uganda. It is the chief town of Budaka District, and the district headquarters are located there.

Location
The coordinates of the town are:01 01 00N, 33 56 42E (Latitude:1.0150; Longitude:33.9450).

Population
The 2002 national population census estimated the town's population at 17,000. The Uganda Bureau of Statistics (UBOS) estimated the 2010 population at 21,100. In 2011, UBOS estimated the population at 21,700.

In 2015, UBOS estimated the mid-year population of the town at 24,500. In 2020, according to UBOS, the mid-year population of Budaka was estimated to have increased to 29,100. Of those, 15,100 (51.9 percent) were females and 14,000 (48.1 percent) were males. The population of the town is calculated to have grown at an average annual growth rate of 3.5 percent, between 2015 and 2020, according to UBOS.

Overview
Naboa Sub-County was given that name by British Colonial masters because the area was full of Grammodes geometrica moths (Nziira) of the family Erebidae.

The Basimba people of the Leopard Clan with the names Katunku, Ngulya, Kaabya, Mwati, Kabolesa, Namuyonjo, Ntembe of Lupada, resident in Naboa Sub-County, Budaka County, Budaka District live among the Bagwere but trace their origin from Tanzania and Zambia.

Points of interest
The following points of interest are located within the town of Budaka or close to the edges of town:

1. The headquarters of Budaka District Administration

2. Bugwere Primary School, with enrollment of about 300 students

3. Budaka central market

4. The offices of Budaka Town Council

5. A mobile branch of PostBank Uganda

6. The Iganga–Tirinyi–Kamonkoli–Mbale Road, passes through town in a general west to east direction.

See also
List of cities and towns in Uganda

References

External links
  Budaka Town Clerk Interdicted Over Abuse

Populated places in Eastern Region, Uganda
Budaka District